Carlos A. Navarro (born December 14, 1980) is an American actor and radio personality.

Early life and Career
Navarro was born 1980 in Queens to a Peru-born father and a Cuba-born mother. He currently lives in Orlando, Florida and co-hosts the popular radio show, The Monsters in the Morning

He played the recurring character Alvaro in AMC's The Walking Dead.

Filmography

Film

Television

Video games

External links

References

1980 births
Living people
American male film actors
American male television actors
American male voice actors
20th-century American male actors
21st-century American male actors